Hordeum is a genus of annual and perennial plants in the grass family. They are native throughout the temperate regions of Africa, Eurasia, and the Americas.

One species, Hordeum vulgare (barley), has become of major commercial importance as a cereal grain, used as fodder crop and for malting in the production of beer and whiskey. Some species are nuisance weeds introduced worldwide by human activities, others have become endangered due to habitat loss.

Hordeum species are used as food plants by the larvae of some Lepidoptera species, including the flame, rustic shoulder-knot and setaceous Hebrew character.

The name Hordeum comes from the Latin word for "to bristle" (horreō, horrēre), and is akin to the word "horror".

Species 
Species include:
 Hordeum aegiceras – Mongolia, China including Tibet
 Hordeum arizonicum US (CA AZ NV NM), Mexico (Baja California, Sonora, Durango)
 Hordeum bogdanii – from Turkey and European Russia to Mongolia
 Hordeum brachyantherum – Russia (Kuril, Kamchatka), Alaska, Canada including Yukon, US (mostly in the West but also scattered locales in the East), Baja California
 Hordeum brachyatherum – Chile
 Hordeum brevisubulatum – European Russia; temperate and subarctic Asia from Turkey and the Urals to China and Magadan
 Hordeum bulbosum – Mediterranean, Central Asia 
 Hordeum californicum – US (CA; OR; NV)
 Hordeum capense – South Africa, Lesotho
 Hordeum chilense – Argentina, Chile (including Juan Fernández Is)
 Hordeum comosum – Argentina, Chile
 Hordeum cordobense – northern Argentina
 Hordeum depressum – US (CA; OR; WA; ID; NV), British Columbia, Baja California
 Hordeum distichon – Iraq
 Hordeum erectifolium – northern Argentina
 Hordeum euclaston – Brazil, Uruguay, Argentina
 Hordeum flexuosum – Uruguay, Argentina
 Hordeum fuegianum – Tierra del Fuego
 Hordeum guatemalense – Guatemala
 Hordeum halophilum – Argentina, Chile, Bolivia, Peru
 Hordeum intercedens (bobtail barley) – California, Baja California
 Hordeum jubatum (foxtail barley) – widespread in US and Canada; Asiatic Russia, Inner Mongolia, Central Asia, Caucasus
 Hordeum × lagunculciforme – Iraq, Turkmenistan, Himalayas, western China
 Hordeum lechleri – Argentina, Chile
 Hordeum marinum (sea barley) – Europe, North Africa, southwestern and central Asia
 Hordeum murinum (wall barley) – Canary Islands, Europe, North Africa, southwestern and central Asia
 Hordeum muticum – Argentina, Chile, Bolivia, Peru
 Hordeum parodii – Argentina
 Hordeum patagonicum – Argentina, Chile
 Hordeum × pavisii – France
 Hordeum procerum – Argentina
 Hordeum pubiflorum – Argentina, Chile
 Hordeum pusillum (little barley) – widespread in Canada and US; northern Mexico, Bermuda, Argentina
 Hordeum roshevitzii – China, Korea, Primorye, Mongolia, Siberia, Kazakhstan
 Hordeum secalinum – Europe, Mediterranean, Caucasus
 Hordeum spontaneum – from Greece and Egypt to central China
 Hordeum stenostachys – Brazil, Argentina, Uruguay, South Africa
 Hordeum tetraploidum – Argentina, Chile
 Hordeum vulgare (barley) – native to the Middle East, now cultivated in many countries

Formerly included species 
Botanists now regard many species as better suited to other genera: Arrhenatherum, Crithopsis, Dasypyrum, Elymus, Eremopyrum, Hordelymus, Leymus, Psathyrostachys, and Taeniatherum.

References

External links

 species of Hordeum in "Wildflowers of Israel": Spntaneous Barley, Bulbous Barley, Wall Barley,  Hordeum marinum,
 Hordeum hystrix, Hordeum vulgare

 
Poaceae genera